The 2017 TCR International Series Spa-Francorchamps round was the third round of the 2017 TCR International Series season. It took place on 5–6 May at the Circuit de Spa-Francorchamps.

Stefano Comini won the first race starting from pole position, driving an Audi RS3 LMS TCR, and Jean-Karl Vernay gained the second one, driving a Volkswagen Golf GTI TCR.

Ballast
Due to the results obtained in the previous round, Roberto Colciago and Dušan Borković both received +30 kg, while Hugo Valente received +10 kg.

The Balance of Performance was also adjusted for this event, meaning the Alfa Romeo Giulietta TCRs was deprived of its -20 kg weight break, it will therefore run its minimum weight of 1285 kg. The Opel Astra TCRs was also given a weight break, going down from +40 kg to +20 kg.

Classification

Qualifying

Notes
 — Davit Kajaia was sent to the back of the grid for Race 1, after an engine change.
 — Maťo Homola, Pierre-Yves Corthals and Davit Kajaia had their best laptimes deleted during Q1 and Q2, for not respecting the track limits.

Race 1

Race 2

Standings after the event

Drivers' Championship standings

Model of the Year standings

Teams' Championship standings

 Note: Only the top five positions are included for both sets of drivers' standings.

References

External links
TCR International Series official website

Spa-Francorchamps
TCR International Series
TCR